William Harry Stodalka (born November 9, 1931) was a Canadian politician. He served in the Legislative Assembly of Saskatchewan from 1975 to 1978, as a Liberal member for the constituency of Maple Creek. He was born in 1931 in Richmound, Saskatchewan to a German father and Scottish mother. He attended the University of Alberta where he earned a Masters of Arts and Bachelor of Education degree. He married Josephine Elizabeth Kambeitz in 1953 and had five children. He was a school superintendent.

References

1931 births
Living people
Canadian people of German-Ukrainian descent
Saskatchewan Liberal Party MLAs